Gul Akhtara Begum is an Indian politician. In 2011 she was elected as MLA of Bilasipara East Vidhan Sabha Constituency in Assam Legislative Assembly. She was an All India United Democratic Front politician. She joined Indian National Congress in 2016.

References

Year of birth missing (living people)
All India United Democratic Front politicians
Women members of the Assam Legislative Assembly
Indian National Congress politicians from Assam
Living people